Mladen Vladojević (1330–48) was a Serbian nobleman who served king and emperor Stefan Dušan (r. 1331–55). Together with his parents, he was the ktetor (founder, donator) of the Church of the Holy Saviour in Prizren (now in Kosovo), built in  1330, as mentioned in the Holy Archangels' Chrysobull (1348). Dušan decided that Mladen together with his mother and relatives, and not alone, were to mark the boundary of their family estate. The church was granted as a metochion (monastic dependency) to the Monastery of the Holy Archangels, the foundation of Stefan Dušan, while Mladen in turn was granted a church in Ohrid, along with its estates. It has been presumed by some historians (Đorđe Sp. Radojičić) that Mladen Vladojević was the same as magnate Mladen ( 1323–26). He was included in the novel Car Dušan (1919) by Vladan Đorđević.

References

Sources

14th-century deaths
13th-century births
14th-century Serbian nobility
Medieval Serbian magnates
People of the Kingdom of Serbia (medieval)
People of the Serbian Empire
Kosovo Serbs
Ktetors